Hutsell is a surname. Notable people with the surname include:

David Hutsell (born 1970), American golfer
Melanie Hutsell (born 1968), American actress and comedian